The 18th Ariel Awards ceremony, organized by the Mexican Academy of Film Arts and Sciences (AMACC) took place on April 22, 1976, in Mexico City. During the ceremony, AMACC presented the Ariel Award in 13 categories honoring films released in 1975. Actas de Marusia was the most nominated film with twelve nominations that resulted in nine wins, including Best Picture and Best Director. Actas de Marusia was selected to represent Mexico at the 48th Academy Awards and received a nomination, which it lost to Dersu Uzala from the Soviet Union.

Winners and nominees
Winners are listed first and highlighted with boldface.

Multiple nominations and awards

The following five films received multiple nominations:

Films that received multiple awards:

References

Ariel Awards ceremonies
1976 film awards
1976 in Mexico